Lucinda Brand (born 2 July 1989) is a Dutch racing cyclist, who rides for UCI Women's WorldTeam  in road racing, and UCI Cyclo-cross Pro Team  in cyclo-cross.

Major results
Source:

Road

2010
 5th Holland Hills Classic
 10th Overall Ster Zeeuwsche Eilanden
 10th Omloop van Borsele
 10th Grand Prix Elsy Jacobs
2011
 2nd Open de Suède Vårgårda TTT
 UEC European Under-23 Road Championships
3rd  Road race
9th Time trial
 7th Overall Holland Ladies Tour
 9th Grand Prix Elsy Jacobs
 10th Trofeo Alfredo Binda-Comune di Cittiglio
2012
 3rd  Team time trial, UCI Road World Championships
 3rd Road race, National Road Championships
 4th Overall Tour Féminin en Limousin
1st Stage 3
 4th La Flèche Wallonne Féminine
 5th Overall La Route de France
1st Stage 3
 6th Overall Emakumeen Euskal Bira
 6th Holland Hills Classic
 9th Tour of Chongming Island
 9th Durango-Durango Emakumeen Saria
2013
 1st  Road race, National Road Championships
 2nd  Team time trial, UCI Road World Championships
 2nd Open de Suède Vårgårda TTT
 3rd Overall Trophée d'Or Féminin
 3rd EPZ Omloop van Borsele
 6th Overall Festival Luxembourgeois du Cyclisme Féminin Elsy Jacobs
 6th GP de Plouay
 7th Overall Thüringen Rundfahrt der Frauen
 8th Overall Emakumeen Euskal Bira
 10th Holland Hills Classic
2014
 1st  Overall Energiewacht Tour
1st Stage 4
 1st GP de Plouay
 1st Stage 2 (TTT) Belgium Tour
 2nd Road race, National Road Championships
 Open de Suède Vårgårda
2nd Team time trial
9th Road race
 9th Novilon EDR Cup
2015
 1st  Road race, National Road Championships
 Open de Suède Vårgårda
1st Team time trial
4th Road race
 Giro Rosa
1st Stages 3 & 7
 2nd Overall Holland Ladies Tour
1st  Points classification
 2nd Sparkassen Giro
 3rd  Team time trial, UCI Road World Championships
 3rd Overall Festival Luxembourgeois du cyclisme féminin Elsy Jacobs
 4th Overall Energiewacht Tour
1st Stage 2b
 4th Ronde van Drenthe World Cup
 5th Time trial, EPZ Omloop van Borsele
 8th La Course by Le Tour de France
2016
 1st  Overall Ladies Tour of Norway
1st Stage 2
 1st Erondegemse Pijl
 3rd Overall Belgium Tour
1st Stage 1
 3rd Gent–Wevelgem
 4th RideLondon Grand Prix
 5th Omloop van het Hageland
 6th Overall Energiewacht Tour
 6th Omloop Het Nieuwsblad
 7th Omloop van de IJsseldelta
 7th Omloop van Borsele
2017
 1st  Team time trial, UCI Road World Championships
 1st Omloop Het Nieuwsblad
 3rd Ronde van Drenthe
 4th Time trial, UEC European Road Championships
 4th Strade Bianche
 4th Dwars door Vlaanderen
 6th Gooik–Geraardsbergen–Gooik
 7th Overall Healthy Ageing Tour
 7th Overall Giro Rosa
1st Stage 8
2018
 Ladies Tour of Norway
1st Team time trial
10th Overall Stage race
 1st Stage 1 (TTT) Madrid Challenge by La Vuelta
 2nd Amstel Gold Race
 2nd Postnord UCI WWT Vårgårda WestSweden TTT
 UCI Road World Championships
3rd  Team time trial
6th Time trial
9th Road race
 3rd Time trial, National Road Championships
 3rd Overall Thüringen Rundfahrt
 4th Overall Giro Rosa
1st Stage 1 (TTT)
2019
 UCI Road World Championships
1st  Mixed team relay
8th Time trial
 2nd Overall Madrid Challenge by la Vuelta
1st  Points classification
 3rd  Time trial, UEC European Road Championships
 3rd Dwars door Vlaanderen for Women
 3rd Postnord UCI WWT Vårgårda West Sweden TTT
 4th Time trial, National Road Championships
 4th Overall Holland Ladies Tour
1st  Mountains classification
 4th La Course by Le Tour de France
 5th Liège–Bastogne–Liège
 6th Overall Giro Rosa
 9th Tour of Flanders
2021
 1st  Overall Thüringen Ladies Tour
1st Stages 3 & 5
 Giro Rosa
1st  Mountains classification
1st Stage 1 (TTT)
 3rd Time trial, National Road Championships
 4th Gran Premio Ciudad de Eibar
 9th Overall Ladies Tour of Norway
 9th Liège–Bastogne–Liège
 9th Brabantse Pijl
 10th Overall Tour Cycliste Féminin International de l'Ardèche
1st Stage 7
2022
 1st  Overall Tour de Suisse
1st  Points classification
1st Stages 1 & 4
 Challenge by La Vuelta
1st Mountains classification
1st Stage 1 (TTT)
 3rd Paris–Roubaix
 8th Overall Tour of Scandinavia

Cyclo-cross

2016–2017
 1st Woerden
 2nd  UEC European Championships
 UCI World Cup
2nd Hoogerheide
 Superprestige
2nd Gieten
 2nd National Championships
 2nd Mol
 2nd Contern
2017–2018
 1st  National Championships
 Soudal Classics
1st Sint-Niklaas
 1st Mol
 2nd  UEC European Championships
 Superprestige
2nd Ruddervoorde
 DVV Trophy
2nd Loenhout
 3rd  UCI World Championships
 3rd Overijse
2018–2019
 1st  National Championships
 UCI World Cup
1st Tábor
1st Namur
1st Hoogerheide
2nd Heusden-Zolder
 DVV Trophy
1st Loenhout
2nd Antwerpen
 Brico Cross
1st Bredene
2nd Essen
 1st Overijse
 2nd  UCI World Championships
 3rd Woerden
2019–2020
 UCI World Cup
1st Namur
1st Heusden-Zolder
1st Hoogerheide
2nd Koksijde
 DVV Trophy
1st Kortrijk
2nd Baal
 Rectavit Series
1st Niel
 2nd Overijse
 3rd  UCI World Championships
 3rd National Championships
2020–2021
 1st  UCI World Championships
 1st  Overall UCI World Cup
1st Tábor
1st Namur
1st Dendermonde
2nd Hulst
2nd Overijse
 1st Overall Superprestige
1st Niel
1st Merksplas
1st Boom
1st Gavere
1st Heusden-Zolder
3rd Gieten
3rd Ruddervoorde
3rd Middelkerke
 1st Overall X²O Badkamers Trophy
1st Kortrijk
2nd Koppenberg
2nd Antwerpen
2nd Herentals
2nd Baal
2nd Lille
 Ethias Cross
1st Kruibeke
3rd Lokeren
3rd Leuven
3rd Eeklo
 1st Mol
 3rd  UEC European Championships
2021–2022
 1st  UEC European Championships
 1st  Overall UCI World Cup
1st Fayetteville
1st Tábor
1st Besançon
1st Namur
1st Dendermonde
1st Hulst
2nd Waterloo
2nd Zonhoven
2nd Rucphen
2nd Hoogerheide
3rd Overijse
3rd Koksijde
 1st Overall Superprestige
1st Gieten
1st Niel
1st Merksplas
1st Boom
1st Heusden-Zolder
1st Gavere
 1st Overall X²O Badkamers Trophy
1st Kortrijk
1st Loenhout
1st Baal
1st Herentals
1st Hamme
1st Lille
2nd Brussels
 1st Sint-Niklaas
 2nd  UCI World Championships
 2nd National Championships  
 3rd Oostmalle
2022–2023
 Exact Cross
1st Meulebeke
2nd Beringen
2nd Mol
3rd Sint-Niklaas
 2nd Overall X²O Badkamers Trophy
2nd Baal
2nd Herentals
2nd Brussels
3rd Koksijde
 UCI World Cup
2nd Fayetteville
2nd Gavere
3rd Waterloo
 Superprestige
2nd Middelkerke
3rd Heusden-Zolder
 3rd  UCI World Championships

References

External links
 
 
 
 
 
 

1989 births
Living people
Dutch female cyclists
Sportspeople from Dordrecht
UCI Road World Championships cyclists for the Netherlands
European Games competitors for the Netherlands
Cyclists at the 2015 European Games
UCI Cyclo-cross World Champions (women)
Cyclo-cross cyclists
Cyclists from South Holland
UCI Road World Champions (women)
21st-century Dutch women